Miss Dora West (1883–1962) O.B.E., was a British Liberal party politician and one of the founders of the League of Nations Union.

Background
She was born in Holbeach, Lincolnshire, a daughter of Alderman William Henry West and Mary Elizabeth Peck. She was a member of a well-known agricultural family of the Fen district. In 1916 she was involved in recruiting work. She lectured in the West Indies, Central America and West Africa.

Political career
Despite being from a Conservative family, in 1918 she became Secretary to William Henry Williams the Liberal candidate for Bedwelty. She was the founding Secretary of the League of Nations Union serving from 1918 to 1919. The League of Nations Union (LNU) was an organization formed in October 1918 in the United Kingdom to promote international justice, collective security and a permanent peace between nations based upon the ideals of the League of Nations. The League of Nations was established by the Great Powers as part of the Paris Peace Treaties, the international settlement that followed the First World War. She became the league's first Secretary. From 1920 to 1921 she acted as Private Secretary to Charles McCurdy, the Food Controller. The Minister of Food Control was a British government ministerial posts separated from that of the Minister of Agriculture. For her work with the Ministry of Food she was awarded the Order of the British Empire medal. In 1921 she followed McCurdy when he was appointed National Liberal Chief Whip. She was Chief Secretary of the Whip's Office. She continued to work for him until the post was wound up in 1922. In 1924 she became active as a speaker for the Liberal Party. 

At the parliamentary General Election of 1929 she contested, as a Liberal party candidate, Rotherhithe in South East London. Rotherhithe was not a promising seat for the Liberals but she still managed to poll a fifth of the vote;

After the elections, she returned to her travels, in 1930 visiting Australia and New Zealand. She appears to have spent some time living in New Zealand but had returned to London by the beginning of 1934. In 1962 shed died in Canterbury aged 79.

References

External links
Dora West page at the National Portrait Gallery:http://www.npg.org.uk/collections/search/person/mp97512/dora-west
Dora West campaigning photograph: http://www.gettyimages.co.uk/detail/news-photo/miss-dora-west-on-of-the-50-candiadates-for-the-election-news-photo/99646705

Liberal Party (UK) parliamentary candidates